"Beautiful Lie" is a pop song recorded by American singer Jennifer Paige and Nick Carter. The song was written by Falk, Paige and Carter. It was released as the first single from her deluxe edition album, Best Kept Secret. "Beautiful Lie" reached number 19 in Germany and number 49 in Austria.

Background
The album Best Kept Secret was re-released as a deluxe edition on November 20, 2009, featuring a few new songs, including the new single, "Beautiful Lie" with Nick Carter.

Track listing
 "Beautiful Lie" — 3:22
 "Beautiful Lie" (Extended Mix) — 4:11

Charts

References

External links
Jennifer Paige "Beautiful Lie" ft. Nick Carter

2009 singles
Jennifer Paige songs
Nick Carter (musician) songs
Male–female vocal duets
Pop ballads
Songs written by Nick Carter (musician)
2008 songs
Songs written by Carl Falk